A Thousand Clowns is a 1965 American comedy-drama film directed by Fred Coe and starring Jason Robards, Barbara Harris, Martin Balsam, and Barry Gordon. An adaptation of a 1962 play by Herb Gardner, it tells the story of an eccentric comedy writer who is forced to conform to society to retain legal custody of his nephew.

Jason Robards starred in both the original Broadway version and in the film. Martin Balsam won the Academy Award for Best Supporting Actor for his performance in the movie.

Plot
Unemployed television writer Murray Burns (Jason Robards) lives in a cluttered New York City studio apartment with his 12-year-old nephew, Nick (Barry Gordon). Murray has been unemployed for five months after quitting his previous job writing jokes for a children's television show called Chuckles the Chipmunk. Nick, the son of Murray's unwed sister, was left with Murray seven years earlier.

When Nick writes a school essay on the benefits of unemployment insurance, his school requests that New York State send social workers to investigate his living conditions. Investigators for the Child Welfare Board Sandra Markowitz (Barbara Harris) and her superior and boyfriend, Albert Amundson (William Daniels), threaten Murray with removal of the child from his custody unless he can prove he is a capable guardian.

Charmed by Nick and Murray, Sandra argues with Albert, who goes off without her to their next case. Sandra spends the night with Murray. She urges Murray to find a job so that he can keep his nephew, and Murray agrees to look. But he walks out of his job interviews, treating them as a joke, because he feels that work would make him conventional and conformist and make every day the same. He apologizes to Sandra, but she is so disappointed in him that she walks out. Yet he knows that if he wishes to keep his nephew, he must swallow his pride and go back to work.

Murray also feels that he cannot let go of Nick until the boy shows some "backbone". In a confrontation with his brother and agent Arnold (Martin Balsam), Murray expounds his nonconformist worldview: that a person must fight at all costs to retain a sense of identity and aliveness and avoid being absorbed by the homogeneous masses. Arnold retorts that by conforming to the dictates of society, he has become "the best possible Arnold Burns".

Murray agrees to meet with his former employer, the detested Chuckles host Leo Herman (Gene Saks). When Nick does not laugh at Leo's pathetic display of comedy, Leo insults Nick, who quietly but firmly puts Leo in his place. Nick becomes upset with Murray for tolerating Leo's insults, and Murray sees the boy has finally grown a backbone. Realizing that Nick has come of age, Murray resigns himself to going back to his old job, Sandra returns, and the next morning Murray joins the crowds of people heading off to work.

Cast

 Jason Robards as Murray Burns
 Barbara Harris as Dr. Sandra Markowitz
 Martin Balsam as Arnold Burns
 Barry Gordon as Nick Burns 
 William Daniels as Albert Amundson
 Gene Saks as Leo "Chuckles the Chipmunk" Herman
 Phil Bruns as Sloan
 John McMartin (as "John Macmartin") as Man in office

Awards and nominations

Music
Music in the film ranges from rudimentary drum cadences to Dixieland arrangements of "The Stars and Stripes Forever". The song "Yes Sir, That's My Baby" is used in several places.

Judy Holliday wrote the lyrics for the theme song "A Thousand Clowns". This was her last film credit, as the film was released after her death on June 7, 1965.

Stage
A Thousand Clowns premiered on the Broadway stage at the Eugene O'Neill Theatre on April 4, 1962 in previews, officially on April 5, 1962, and closed on 
April 13, 1963, after 428 performances. Directed by Fred Coe, the cast featured Jason Robards, Jr. (Murray Burns), Sandy Dennis (Sandra Markowitz), Gene Saks (Leo Herman), Barry Gordon (Nick Burns), William Daniels (Albert Amundson), and Larry Haines (Arnold Burns). Sets and lighting were by George Jenkins, and costumes were by Ruth Morley.

Walter Kerr, in his review for the New York Herald Tribune, wrote of Sandy Dennis: "Let me tell you about Sandy Dennis. There should be one in every home."

After touring stops in Durham, Chicago, and Boston, A Thousand Clowns returned to Broadway at the Longacre Theatre on July 4, 2001 in previews, officially on July 11, 2001, and closed on September 23, 2001 after 83 performances. The revival starred Tom Selleck as Murray Burns, Barbara Garrick as Sandra Markowitz, Mark Blum as Leo Herman, Nicolas King as Nick Burns, Bradford Cover as Albert Amundson, and Robert LuPone as Arnold Burns.

Awards and nominations

See also
List of American films of 1965

References

Further reading
 Hagopian, Kevin. A Thousand Clowns

External links

 
 A Thousand Clowns at the Internet Broadway Database
 
 
 
 

1962 plays
American plays adapted into films
Broadway plays
Plays by Herb Gardner
Plays set in New York City
1965 films
1965 comedy-drama films
1965 directorial debut films
1965 independent films
American black-and-white films
American comedy-drama films
American films based on plays
American independent films
Films featuring a Best Supporting Actor Academy Award-winning performance
Films set in New York City
Films shot in New York City
United Artists films
Films directed by Fred Coe
1960s English-language films
1960s American films